Martin Saarikangas (born 24 January 1937) is a Finnish shipbuilder and vuorineuvos, best known as the co-founder of Masa-Yards (now Meyer Turku), after the bankruptcy of Wärtsilä Marine. From 2003 to 2007 he was a member of the Finnish Parliament as part of the National Coalition Party. In 1994 he played three minutes for Finnish association football top flight side TPS Turku at the age of 57.

References 
 The bankruptcy was unnecessary, interview of Martin Saarikangas in Scandinavian Shipping Gazette, February 22, 2008, network edition.
 Iso-Masa, laivanrakentaja Ajatus Kirjat, 2002

External links 
 Home page

1937 births
Living people
Businesspeople from Helsinki
National Coalition Party politicians
Wärtsilä